The Bedouin, Beduin, or Bedu (singular  ) are nomadic Arab tribes who have historically inhabited the desert regions in the Arabian Peninsula, North Africa, the Levant, and Mesopotamia. The Bedouin originated in the Syrian Desert and Arabian Desert but spread across the rest of the Arab world in West Asia and North Africa after the spread of Islam. The English word bedouin comes from the Arabic badawī, which means "desert dweller", and is traditionally contrasted with ḥāḍir, the term for sedentary people. Bedouin territory stretches from the vast deserts of North Africa to the rocky sands of the Middle East. They are traditionally divided into tribes, or clans (known in Arabic as ʿašāʾir;  or qabāʾil ), and historically share a common culture of herding camels and goats. The vast majority of Bedouins adhere to Islam, although there are some fewer numbers of Christian Bedouins present in the Fertile Crescent.

Bedouins have been referred to by various names throughout history, including Arabaa by the Assyrians (ar-ba-ea) being a nisba of the noun Arab, a name still used for Bedouins today. They are referred to as the ʾAʿrāb in Arabic. While many Bedouins have abandoned their nomadic and tribal traditions for a modern urban lifestyle, others retain traditional Bedouin culture such as the traditional ʿašāʾir clan structure, traditional music, poetry, dances (such as saas), and many other cultural practices and concepts. Urbanized Bedouins often organise cultural festivals, usually held several times a year, in which they gather with other Bedouins to partake in and learn about various Bedouin traditions—from poetry recitation and traditional sword dances to playing traditional instruments and even classes teaching traditional tent knitting. Traditions like camel riding and camping in the deserts are still popular leisure activities for urban Bedouins who live in close proximity to deserts or other wilderness areas.

Society 
A widely quoted Bedouin apothegm is "I am against my brother, my brother and I are against my cousin, my cousin and I are against the stranger" sometimes quoted as "I and my brother are against my cousin, I and my cousin are against the stranger." This saying signifies a hierarchy of loyalties based on the proximity of some person to oneself, beginning with the self, and proceeding through the nuclear family as defined by male kinship, and then, in principle at least, to an entire genetic or linguistic group (which is perceived as akin to kinship in the Middle East and North Africa generally). Disputes are settled, interests are pursued, and justice and order are dispensed and maintained by means of this framework, organized according to an ethic of self-help and collective responsibility (Andersen 14). The individual family unit (known as a tent or "gio" ) typically consisted traditionally of three or four adults (a married couple plus siblings or parents) and any number of children.

The Bedouins’ ethos comprised courage, hospitality, loyalty to family and pride of ancestry. Bedouin tribes were not controlled by a central power, like a government or emperor, but rather were led by tribal chiefs. Some chiefs exercised their power from oases, where merchants would organise trade through the territory controlled by the tribe. The structure of Bedouin tribes were held together more so by shared feelings of common ancestry rather than a tribal chief atop the hierarchy. 

When resources were plentiful, several tents would travel together as a goum. While these groups were sometimes linked by patriarchal lineage, others were just as likely linked by marriage alliances (new wives were especially likely to have close male relatives join them). These were often linked to goums, but where a goum would generally consist of people all with the same herd type, descent groups were frequently split up over several economic activities, thus allowing a degree of 'risk management'; should one group of members of a descent group suffer economically, the other members of the descent group would be able to support them. Whilst the phrase "descent group" suggests purely a lineage-based arrangement, in reality these groups were fluid and adapted their genealogies to take in new members.

The largest scale of tribal interactions is the tribe as a whole, led by a Sheikh (literally, "old man"), though the title refers to leaders in varying contexts. The tribe often claims descent from one common ancestor—as mentioned above. The tribal level is the level that mediated between the Bedouin and the outside governments and organizations. Distinct structure of the Bedouin society leads to long-lasting rivalries between different clans.

Bedouin traditionally had strong honor codes, and traditional systems of justice dispensation in Bedouin society typically revolved around such codes. The bisha'a, or ordeal by fire, is a well-known Bedouin practice of lie detection. See also: Honor codes of the Bedouin, Bedouin systems of justice.

Traditions

Herding

Livestock and herding, principally of goats, sheep and dromedary camels comprised the traditional livelihoods of Bedouins. These were used for meat, dairy products, and wool. Most of the staple foods that made up the Bedouins' diet were dairy products.

Camels, in particular, had numerous cultural and functional uses. Having been regarded as a "gift from God", they were the main food source and method of transportation for many Bedouins. In addition to their extraordinary milking potentials under harsh desert conditions, their meat was occasionally consumed by Bedouins. As a cultural tradition, camel races were organized during celebratory occasions, such as weddings or religious festivals.

Some Bedouin societies live in arid regions. In areas where rainfall is very unpredictable, a camp will be moved irregularly, depending on the availability of green pasture. Where winter rainfall is more predictable in regions further south, some Bedouin people plant grain along their migration routes. This proves a resource for the livestock throughout the winter. In regions such as western Africa, where there is more predictable rainfall, the Bedouin practice transhumance. They plant crops near permanent homes in the valleys where there is more rain and move their livestock to the highland pastures.

Oral poetry 
Oral poetry is the most popular art form among Bedouins. Having a poet in one's tribe was highly regarded in society. In addition to serving as a form of art, poetry was used as a means of conveying information and social control. Bedouin poetry, also known as nabati poetry, is often recited in the vernacular dialect. In contrast, the more common forms of Arabic poetry are often in Modern Standard Arabic.

Raiding or ghazw
The well-regulated traditional habit of Bedouin tribes of raiding other tribes, caravans, or settlements is known in Arabic as ghazw.

History

Early history

Historically, the Bedouin engaged in nomadic herding, agriculture and sometimes fishing in the Syrian steppe since 6000 BCE. By about 850 BCE, a complex network of settlements and camps was established. The earliest Arab tribes emerged from Bedouins. A major source of income for these people was the taxation of caravans, and tributes collected from non-Bedouin settlements. They also earned income by transporting goods and people in caravans pulled by domesticated camels across the desert. Scarcity of water and of permanent pastoral land required them to move constantly.

The Moroccan traveller Ibn Battuta reported that in 1326 on the route to Gaza, the Egyptian authorities had a customs post at Qatya on the north coast of Sinai. Here Bedouin were being used to guard the road and track down those trying to cross the border without permission.

The Early Medieval grammarians and scholars seeking to develop a system of standardizing the contemporary Classical Arabic for maximal intelligibility across the Arabophone areas, believed that the Bedouin spoke the purest, most conservative variety of the language. To solve irregularities of pronunciation, the Bedouin were asked to recite certain poems, whereafter consensus was relied on to decide the pronunciation and spelling of a given word.

Ottoman period

A plunder and massacre of the Hajj caravan by Bedouin tribesmen occurred in 1757, led by Qa'dan Al - Fayez of the Bani Sakhr tribe (Modern-day Jordan) in his vengeance against the Ottomans for failing to pay his tribe for their help protecting the pilgrims. An estimated 20,000 pilgrims were either killed in the raid or died of hunger or thirst as a result including relatives of the Sultan and Musa Pasha. Although Bedouin raids on Hajj caravans were fairly common, the 1757 raid represented the peak of such attacks which was also likely prompted by the major drought of 1756.

Under the Tanzimat reforms in 1858 a new Ottoman Land Law was issued, which offered legal grounds for the displacement of the Bedouin (Turkish: Bedeviler). As the Ottoman Empire gradually lost power, this law instituted an unprecedented land registration process that was also meant to boost the empire's tax base. Few Bedouin opted to register their lands with the Ottoman Tapu, due to lack of enforcement by the Ottomans, illiteracy, refusal to pay taxes and lack of relevance of written documentation of ownership to the Bedouin way of life at that time.

At the end of the 19th century Sultan Abdülhamid II settled Muslim populations (Circassians) from the Balkan and Caucasus among areas predominantly populated by the nomads in the regions of modern Syria, Lebanon, Jordan, and Israel, and also created several permanent Bedouin settlements, although the majority of them did not remain. The settlement of non Arabs in the traditionally Bedouin areas was a big cause of discontent. This became even severe because every Arab tribe, including the settled ones, have ancestry as a Bedouin.

Ottoman authorities also initiated private acquisition of large plots of state land offered by the sultan to the absentee landowners (effendis). Numerous tenants were brought in order to cultivate the newly acquired lands. Often it came at the expense of the Bedouin lands.

In the late 19th century, many Bedouin began transition to a semi-nomadic lifestyle. One of the factors was the influence of the Ottoman empire authorities who started a forced sedentarization of the Bedouin living on its territory. The Ottoman authorities viewed the Bedouin as a threat to the state's control and worked hard on establishing law and order in the Negev. During the First World War, the Negev Bedouin initially fought with the Ottomans against the British. However, under the influence of British agent T. E. Lawrence, the Bedouins switched side and fought against the Ottomans. Hamad Pasha al-Sufi (died 1923), Sheikh of the Nijmat sub-tribe of the Tarabin, led a force of 1,500 men who joined the Ottoman raid on the Suez Canal.

In Orientalist historiography, the Negev Bedouin have been described as remaining largely unaffected by changes in the outside world until recently. Their society was often considered a "world without time." Recent scholars have challenged the notion of the Bedouin as 'fossilized,' or 'stagnant' reflections of an unchanging desert culture. Emanuel Marx has shown that Bedouin were engaged in a constantly dynamic reciprocal relation with urban centers. Bedouin scholar Michael Meeker explains that "the city was to be found in their midst."

At the time of World War I, a Qays Bedouin tribe from Harran, not far from Urfa, settled in Lüleburgaz in East Thrace under their last Sheikh Salih Abdullah. It is said that this tribe was originally from Tihamah.

In the 20th century
Ghazzu was still relevant to the Bedouin lifestyle in the early 20th century. After a 1925 stay with Sheikh Mithqal Al-Fayez of the Bani Sakher, William Seabrook wrote about his experience of a ghazzu from the Sardieh tribe on Mithqal's 500 Hejin racing camels. The ghazzu was intercepted by Mithqal when he was notified about the Sardieh tribe's intentions from a man from the Bani Hassan tribe, who rode continuously for over 30 hours to reach Mithqal before their plot matured. Mithqal, using the information, prepared a trap for them, which resulted in the imprisonment of one of the Sardieh warriors. William notes that although the warrior was a prisoner, he was nonchalant and was not treated aggressively, and that the ghazzu wasn't a war, but a game in which camels and goats were the prizes.
In the 1950s and 1960s, large numbers of Bedouin throughout Midwest Asia started to leave the traditional, nomadic life to settle in the cities of Midwest Asia, especially as hot ranges shrank and populations grew. For example, in Syria, the Bedouin way of life effectively ended during a severe drought from 1958 to 1961, which forced many Bedouin to abandon herding for standard jobs. Similarly, governmental policies in Egypt, Israel, Jordan, Iraq, Tunisia, oil-producing Arab states of the Persian Gulf and Libya, as well as a desire for improved standards of living, effectively led most Bedouin to become settled citizens of various nations, rather than stateless nomadic herders.

Governmental policies pressing the Bedouin have in some cases been executed in an attempt to provide service (schools, health care, law enforcement and so on—see Chatty 1986 for examples), but in others have been based on the desire to seize land traditionally roved and controlled by the Bedouin. In recent years, some Bedouin have adopted the pastime of raising and breeding white doves, while others have rejuvenated the traditional practice of falconry.

In different countries

Saudi Arabia

The Arabian Peninsula was one of the original homes of the Bedouin. From there, they started to spread out to surrounding deserts, forced out by the lack of water and food. According to tradition, Arabian Bedouin tribes are descendants of two groups: Qahtanis, also known as Yaman, who originate from the mountains of Southwestern Arabia, and claim descent from a semi-legendary ancestral figure, Qahtan (often linked to the biblical Joktan), and Adnanis, also known as Qays, who originate in North-Central Arabia and claimed descent from Adnan, a descendant of the Biblical Ishmael.

A number of Bedouin tribes reside in Saudi Arabia. Among them are Anazzah, Juhaynah, Shammar, al-Murrah, Mahra, Dawasir, Harb, Ghamid, Mutayr, Subay', 'Utayba, Bani khalid, Qahtan, Rashaida, and Banu Yam. In Arabia and the adjacent deserts there are around 100 large tribes of 1,000 members or more. Some tribes number up to 20,000 and a few of the larger tribes may have up to 100,000 members. Inside Saudi Arabia the Bedouin remained the majority of the population during the first half of the 20th century. Saudi Arabia pursued a policy of sedentarization in the early 20th century, which was initially linked with the establishment of the Ikhwan. As a result of this policy and subsequent modernization, the number of bedouin that retain their nomadic lifestyle has decreased rapidly.

According to Ali Al-Naimi, the Bedouin, or Bedu, would travel in family and tribal groups, across the Arabian Peninsula in groups of fifty to a hundred. A clan was composed of a number of families, while a number of clans formed a tribe. Tribes would have areas reserved for their livestock called , which included wells for their exclusive use. They lived in black goat-hair tents called bayt al-shar, divided by cloth curtains into rug-floor areas for males, family and cooking. In Hofuf, they bartered their sheep, goats and camels, including milk and wool, for grain and other staples. Al-Naimi also quotes Paul Harrison's observation of the Bedouin, "There seems to be no limit at all to their endurance."

Syria

The Syrian Desert was the original homeland of the Arab Bedouin tribes which have been mentioned as far back as the Neo-Assyrian era where they're referred to by Tiglath-Pileser III as being among the Syrians integrated into the Assyrian administrative system. Today there are over a million Bedouin living in Syria, making a living herding sheep and goats. The largest Bedouin clan in Syria is called Ruwallah who are part of the 'Anizzah' tribe. Another famous branch of the Anizzah tribe is the two distinct groups of Hasana and S'baa who largely arrived from the Arabian peninsula in the 18th century.

Herding among the Bedouin was common until the late 1950s, when it effectively ended during a severe drought from 1958 to 1961. Due to the drought, many Bedouin were forced to give up herding for standard jobs.  Another factor was the formal annulling of the Bedouin tribes' legal status in Syrian law in 1958, along with attempts of the ruling Ba'ath Party regime to wipe out tribalism. Preferences for customary law ('urf) in contrast to state law (qanun) have been informally acknowledged and tolerated by the state in order to avoid having its authority tested in the tribal territories. In 1982 the al-Assad family turned to the Bedouin tribe leaders for assistance during the Muslim Brotherhood uprising against al-Assad government (see 1982 Hama massacre). The Bedouin sheikhs' decision to support Hafez al-Assad led to a change in attitude on the part of the government that permitted the Bedouin leadership to manage and transform critical state development efforts supporting their own status, customs and leadership.

As a result of the Syrian Civil War some Bedouins became refugees and found shelter in Jordan, Turkey, Lebanon, and other states.

Palestine 

Palestinian Bedouins were originally from the Negev Desert. In the course of the 1948 Palestine war, they fled or were displaced from their land. Other Bedouins were expelled from the Negev in 1953 and had relocated to the West Bank, which at the time belonged to Jordan. Today, there are 40,000 Bedouins in the whole of the West Bank, including 27,000 people under Israeli military control in Area C. Unlike Negev Bedouins, West Bank Bedouins are not Israeli citizens. Bedouin communities in the West bank have been targeted with forcible relocations to townships to accommodate the growth of Israeli settlements on the outskirts of East Jerusalem. Bedouins also live in the Gaza strip, including 5,000 in Om al-Nasr. However, the number of nomadic Bedouins is shrinking and many are now settled.

Israel 

Prior to the 1948 Israeli Declaration of Independence, an estimated 65,000–90,000 Bedouins lived in the Negev desert. According to Encyclopedia Judaica, 15,000 Bedouin remained in the Negev after 1948; other sources put the number as low as 11,000. Another source states that in 1999 110,000 Bedouins lived in the Negev, 50,000 in the Galilee and 10,000 in the central region of Israel. All of the Bedouins residing in Israel were granted Israeli citizenship in 1954.

As of 2020, there are 210,000 Bedouins in Israel: 150,000 in the Negev, 50,000 in Galilee and the Jezreel Valley, and 10,000 in the central region of Israel.

Galilee Bedouins have been living in the northern part of Israel for four centuries. Today, they live in 28 settlements in the north. They also live in mixed villages with other non-Bedouin Arabs.

The Bedouin who remained in the Negev belonged to the Tiaha confederation as well as some smaller groups such as the 'Azazme and the Jahalin. After 1948, some Negev Bedouins were displaced. The Jahalin tribe, for instance, lived in the Tel Arad region of the Negev prior to the 1950s. In the early 1950s, the Jahalin were among the tribes that, according to Emanuel Marx, "moved or were removed by the military government". They ended up in the so-called E1 area East of Jerusalem.

About 1,600 Bedouin serve as volunteers in the Israel Defense Forces, many as trackers in the IDF's elite tracking units.

Famously, Bedouin shepherds were the first to discover the Dead Sea Scrolls, a collection of Jewish texts from antiquity, in the Judean caves of Qumran in 1946. Of great religious, cultural, historical and linguistic significance, 972 texts were found over the following decade, many of which were discovered by Bedouins. Successive Israeli administrations tried to demolish Bedouins villages in the Negev. Between 1967 and 1989, Israel built seven legal townships in the north-east of the Negev, with Tel as-Sabi or Tel Sheva the first. The largest, city of Rahat, has a population of over 58,700 (as of December 2013); as such it is the largest Bedouin settlement in the world. Another well-known township out of the seven of them that the Israeli government built, is Hura. According to the Israel Land Administration (2007), some 60 per cent of the Negev Bedouin live in urban areas. The rest live in so-called unrecognized villages, which are not officially recognized by the state due to general planning issues and other political reasons. They were built chaotically without taking into consideration local infrastructure. These communities are scattered all over the Northern Negev and often are situated in inappropriate places, such as military fire zones, natural reserves, landfills, etc. On 29 September 2003, Israeli government adapted a new "Abu Basma Plan" (Resolution 881), according to which a new regional council was formed, unifying a number of unrecognized Bedouin settlements—Abu Basma Regional Council. This resolution also regarded the need to establish seven new Bedouin settlements in the Negev, literally meaning the official recognition of unrecognized settlements, providing them with a municipal status and consequently with all the basic services and infrastructure. The council was established by the Interior Ministry on 28 January 2004.
Israel is currently building or enlarging some 13 towns and cities in the Negev. According to the general planning, all of them will be fully equipped with the relevant infrastructure: schools, medical clinics, postal offices, etc. and they also will have electricity, running water and waste control. Several new industrial zones meant to fight unemployment are planned, some are already being constructed, like Idan HaNegev in the suburbs of Rahat. It will have a hospital and a new campus inside. The Bedouins of Israel receive free education and medical services from the state. They are allotted child cash benefits, which has contributed to the high birth rate among the Bedouin  of 5% per year. But unemployment rate remains very high, and few obtain a high school degree (4%), and even fewer graduate from university (0.6%).

In September 2011, the Israeli government approved a five-year economic development plan called the Prawer plan. One of its implications is a relocation of some 30.000-40.000 Negev Bedouin from areas not recognized by the government to government-approved townships. In a 2012 resolution the European Parliament called for the withdrawal of the Prawer plan and respect for the rights of the Bedouin people. In September 2014, Yair Shamir, who heads the Israeli government's ministerial committee on Bedouin resettlement arrangements, stated that the government was examining ways to lower the birthrate of the Bedouin community in order to improve its standard of living. Shamir claimed that without intervention, the Bedouin population could exceed half a million by 2035.

In May 2015, the United Nations Office for the Coordination of Humanitarian Affairs and the United Nations Relief and Works Agency for Palestine Refugees have combined forces. Both organizations called on Israel to stop its plans to relocate Bedouin communities currently living in the West Bank to land outside of Jerusalem for better access to infrastructure, health, and education. Officials stated that a "forcible transfer" of over 7000 Bedouin people would "destroy their culture and livelihoods."

Jordan

Most of the Bedouin tribes migrated from the Arabian Peninsula to what is Jordan today between the 14th and 18th centuries. Often they are referred to as a backbone of the Kingdom, since Bedouin clans traditionally support the monarchy.

Most of Jordan's Bedouin live in the vast wasteland that extends east from the Desert Highway. The eastern Bedouin are camel breeders and herders, while the western Bedouin herd sheep and goats. Some Bedouin in Jordan are semi-nomads, they adopt a nomadic existence during part of the year but return to their lands and homes in time to practice agriculture.

The largest nomadic groups of Jordan are the Bani Hasan (Mafraq, Zarqa, Jarash, Ajloun and parts of Amman) Bani Ṣakher (Amman and Madaba) Banū Laith (Petra, and Banū al-Ḥuwayṭāt (they reside in Wadi Rum). There are numerous lesser groups, such as the al-Sirḥān, Banū Khālid, Hawazim, ʿAṭiyyah, and Sharafāt. The Ruwālah (Rwala) tribe, which is not indigenous, passes through Jordan in its yearly wandering from Syria to Saudi Arabia.

The Jordanian government provides the Bedouin with different services such as education, housing and health clinics. However, some Bedouins give it up and prefer their traditional nomadic lifestyle.

In the recent years there is a growing discontent of the Bedouin with the ruling monarch Abdullah II of Jordan. In August 2007, police clashed with some 200 Bedouins who were blocking the main highway between Amman and the port of Aqaba. Livestock herders were protesting the government's lack of support in the face of the steeply rising cost of animal feed and expressed resentment about government assistance to refugees.

Arab Spring events in 2011 led to demonstrations in Jordan, and Bedouins took part in them. But the Hashemites did not see a revolt similar to turbulence in other Arab states. The main reasons for that are the high respect to the monarch and contradictory interests of different groups of the Jordanian society. The King Abdullah II maintains his distance from the complaints by allowing blame to fall on government ministers, whom he replaces at will.

Maghreb

In the 11th century, the Bedouin tribes of Banu Hilal and Banu Sulaym, who originated from central and north Arabia respectively, living at the time in a desert between the Nile and the Red Sea, moved westward into the Maghreb areas and were joined by the Bedouin tribe of Ma'qil, which had its roots in South Arabia, as well as other Arab tribes. The vizier of the caliph of Cairo chose to let go of the Maghreb and obtained the agreement of his sovereign. They set off with women, children, camping equipment, some stopping on the way, especially in Cyrenaica, where they are still one of the essential elements of the settlement, but most arrived in Ifriqiya by the Gabes region; Berber armies were defeated in trying to protect the walls of Kairouan.

The Zirids abandoned Kairouan to take refuge on the coast where they survived for a century. Ifriqiya, the Banu Hilal and Banu Sulaym spread is on the high plains of Constantine where they gradually choked the Qal'a of Banu Hammad, as they had done Kairouan few decades ago. From there, they gradually gained the upper Algiers and Oran plains, some were taken to the Moulouya valley and in Doukkala plains by the Caliph of Marrakesh in the second half of the 12th century.

Ibn Khaldun, a Muslim historian wrote: "Similar to an army of locusts, they destroy everything in their path."

The Maghrebi Bedouin dialects, often called Hilalian dialects, are used in the regions of Morocco Atlantic Coast, in regions of High Plains and Sahara in Algeria, in regions of Tunisian Sahel and in regions of Tripolitania. The Bedouin dialects has four major varieties:
 Sulaym dialects, Libya and southern Tunisia;
 Eastern Hilal dialects, central Tunisia and eastern Algeria;
 Central Hilal dialects, south and central Algeria, especially in border areas of Sahara;
 Maqil dialects, western Algeria and Morocco;

In Morocco, Bedouin Arabic dialects are spoken in plains and in recently founded cities such as Casablanca. Thus, the city Arabic dialect shares with the Bedouin dialects gal 'to say' (qala); they also represent the bulk of modern urban dialects (Koinés), such as those of Oran and Algiers.

Egypt

Bedouins in Egypt mostly reside in the Sinai peninsula, Matruh, Red Sea governate, eastern parts of Sharqia governate, Suez, Ismailia and in the suburbs of the Egyptian capital of Cairo. The past few decades have been difficult for traditional Bedouin culture due to changing surroundings and the establishment of new resort towns on the Red Sea coast, such as Sharm el-Sheikh. Bedouins in Egypt are facing a number of challenges: the erosion of traditional values, unemployment, and various land issues. With urbanization and new education opportunities, Bedouins started to marry outside their tribe, a practice that once was completely inappropriate.

Bedouins living in the Sinai peninsula did not benefit much from employment in the initial construction boom due to low wages offered. Sudanese and Egyptian workers were brought there as construction labourers instead. When the tourist industry started to bloom, local Bedouins increasingly moved into new service positions such as cab drivers, tour guides, campgrounds or cafe managers. However, the competition is very high, and many Sinai Bedouins are unemployed. Since there are not enough employment opportunities, Tarabin Bedouins, as well as other Bedouin tribes living along the border between Egypt and Israel, are involved in inter-border smuggling of drugs and weapons, as well as infiltration of prostitutes and African labour workers.

In most countries in the Middle East, the Bedouin have no land rights, only users' privileges, and it is especially true for Egypt. Since the mid-1980s, the Bedouins who held desirable coastal property have lost control of much of their land as it was sold by the Egyptian government to hotel operators. The Egyptian government did not see the land as belonging to Bedouin tribes, but rather as state property.

In the summer of 1999, the latest dispossession of the land took place when the army bulldozed Bedouin-run tourist campgrounds north of Nuweiba as part of the final phase of hotel development in the sector, overseen by the Tourist Development Agency (TDA). The director of the Tourist Development Agency dismissed Bedouin rights to most of the land, saying that they had not lived on the coast prior to 1982. Their traditional semi-nomadic culture has left Bedouins vulnerable to such claims.

The Egyptian Revolution of 2011 brought more freedom to the Sinai Bedouin, but since it was deeply involved in drug smuggling into Gaza after a number of terror attacks on the Egypt-Israel border a new Egyptian government has started a military operation in Sinai in the summer-fall of 2012. The Egyptian army has demolished over 120 tunnels leading from Egypt to Gaza that were used as smuggling channels and gave profit to the Bedouin families on the Egyptian side, as well as the Palestinian clans on the other side of the border. Thus the army has delivered a threatening message to local Bedouin, compelling them to cooperate with state troops and officials. After negotiations, the military campaign ended up with a new agreement between the Bedouin and Egyptian authorities.

Tribes and populations 

There are a number of Bedouin tribes, but the total population is often difficult to determine, especially as many Bedouin have ceased to lead nomadic or semi-nomadic lifestyles. Below is a partial list of Bedouin tribes and their historic place of origin.

Otaibah, located in Najd and Hijaz, found mainly in the Arabian Peninsula in Saudi Arabia, Kuwait, and the United Arab Emirates.
Harb, located in the Arabian Peninsula.
Beni Sakher, located in Jordan, Egypt, Syria, and Iraq. Families in the tribe such as the Al-Fayez, Al-Zaben, Al Hgeish, Al-Jboor, and the Al-Khreisheh represent the tribe in Jordan and wield significant political power in the country after the Hashemites. There are other families that are smaller in size including Al-Mteirat, Al-Hamed, Al-Badarin, and Al-Othman. 
Banu Hilal, located in Saudi Arabia, Morocco, Algeria, Tunisia and Libya. The tribe originated in Najd, but migrated in the 11th century to North Africa in what is famously known as Taghribat Bani Hilal.
Banu Sulaym, located in Libya, Tunisia, Algeria, Morocco and Syria.
 'Anizzah, some of the clans of this tribe are Bedouins, they live in northern Saudi Arabia, western Iraq, the Gulf states, Syrian steppe and in Bekaa.
 'Azazima, Negev desert and Egypt.
 Beni Hamida, east of Dead Sea, Jordan.
 Banu Yam centered in Najran Province, Saudi Arabia and Iraq. and is divided into Bedouins and urban
 Dulaim, a very large and powerful tribe in Al Anbar, Western Iraq.
 al-Amad (alAmad, Al Amad, Al-Amad family) of al-Umdah clan ("The Mayors Tribe"), one of the smaller yet prominent tribes of the Arabian Peninsula. Mostly scattered across Iraq, Jordan, Kuwait, Saudi Arabia, Oman, Palestine and United Arab Emirates. This tribe is also associated with Samaritan ancestry (Samaritans).
 al-Abadi "Abadi clan" mostly based in Jordan. Very well respected across the country with influential positions in the Army and national services. 
al-Duwasir, also known as al-Dousari located in central Saudi Arabia, especially Wadi Al-Dawasir, as well as Eastern Arabia in the Eastern Province of Saudi Arabia, Bahrain, Kuwait, and Qatar.
 Ghamid, large tribe from Al-Bahah Province, Saudi Arabia, mostly settled, but with a small Bedouin section known as Badiyat Ghamid.
 al-Hadid, large Bedouin tribe found in Iraq, Syria and Jordan. Now mostly are settled in cities such as Haditha in Iraq, Homs & Hama in Syria, and Amman in Jordan.
 al-Howeitat, one of the largest tribes in Jordan, northern Saudi Arabia, and eastern Egypt. The descends from Judham, an ancient north Arabian Qahtanite tribe.
 Qahtan, one of the largest tribes in the Arabian Peninsula. The Bedouin portion of the tribe roamed an area extended from the South of Najd to the Southwest of Saudi Arabia.
 Al-Dhafeer in Northeast Saudi Arabia and Kuwait.
 Mutayr in Central and Eastern Saudi Arabia.
 Bani Khalid, some of its clans are Bedouins in Eastern Saudi Arabia, Kuwait, Qatar, Jordan, Egypt and Syria.
 Al Murrah are one of the largest and powerful tribes of the Arabian Peninsula covering Southeastern Saudi Arabia, Qatar and United Arab Emirates. The tribe historically roamed the Empty Quarter desert.
 Ajman of Eastern Saudi Arabia.
 al-Mawasi, a group living on the central Gaza Strip coast.
 Ma'qil, a Bedouin tribe of Yemeni origin, located in Morocco, Western Sahara, Mauritania, and west Algeria.
 Muzziena tribe in Dahab and South Sinai (Egypt).
 Shahran (al-Ariydhah), a very large tribe residing in the area between Bisha, Khamis Mushait and Abha. Al-Arydhah 'wide' is a famous name for Shahran because it has a very large area, in Saudi Arabia.
 Shammar, a very large and influential tribe. The Bedouins of this tribe live in Iraq, northern Saudi Arabia, Syria and Jordan. Descended from the ancient tribe of Tayy from Najd.
 Subay', Some of the clans of this tribe are bedouins and live in the far south of the Najd region.
 Tarabin—one of the largest tribes in Egypt (Sinai) and Israel (Negev). 
 Tuba-Zangariyye, Israel near the Jordan river cliff in the Eastern Galilee.
 Al Wahiba, a large tribe in Oman residing in the Sharqiya Sands, also known as the Wahiba Sands
 Al Rashaida is originally a tribe from the Hejaz, but large portions of it have migrated to Eritrea and Eastern Sudan. Although bedouins from other tribes have migrated with them as well, the name has come to refer to all of them.

See also 
 Arab (etymology)
 Ardah
 Bedawi Arabic
 Ghinnawa
 Qedarites
 Tribes of Arabia
 Everyday Resistance

References

Further reading 
 
 
 Brous, Devorah. "The 'Uprooting:' Education Void of Indigenous 'Location-Specific' Knowledge, Among Negev Bedouin Arabs in Southern Israel". International Perspectives on Indigenous Education. (Ben Gurion University 2004)
 Chatty, D Mobile Pastoralists 1996. Broad introduction to the topic, specific focus on women's issues.
 Chatty, Dawn. From Camel to Truck. The Bedouin in the Modern World. New York: Vantage Press. 1986
 Cole, Donald P. "Where have the Bedouin gone?" Anthropological Quarterly. Washington: Spring 2003.Vol.76, Iss. 2; pg. 235
 Falah, Ghazi. "Israeli State Policy Towards Bedouin Sedentarization in the Negev", Journal of Palestine Studies, 1989 Vol. XVIII, No. 2, pp. 71–91
 Falah, Ghazi. "The Spatial Pattern of Bedouin Sedentarization in Israel", GeoJournal, 1985 Vol. 11, No. 4, pp. 361–368.
 Gardner, Andrew. "The Political Ecology of Bedouin Nomadism in the Kingdom of Saudi Arabia". In Political Ecology Across Spaces, Scales and Social Groups, Lisa Gezon and Susan Paulson, eds. Rutgers: Rutgers University Press.
 Gardner, Andrew. "The New Calculus of Bedouin Pastoral Nomadism in the Kingdom of Saudi Arabia". Human Organization 62 (3): 267–276.
 Gardner, Andrew and Timothy Finan. "Navigating Modernization: Bedouin Pastoralism and Climate Information in the Kingdom of Saudi Arabia". MIT Electronic Journal of Middle East Studies 4 (Spring): 59–72.
 Gardner, Ann. "At Home in South Sinai." Nomadic Peoples 2000.Vol.4, Iss. 2; pp. 48–67. Detailed account of Bedouin women.
 Jarvis, Claude Scudamore. Yesterday and To-day in Sinai. Edinburgh/London: W. Blackwood & Sons, 1931; Three Deserts. London: John Murray, 1936; Desert and Delta. London: John Murray, 1938. Sympathetic accounts by a colonial administrator in Sinai.
 Lancaster, William. The Rwala Bedouin Today 1981 (Second Edition 1997). Detailed examination of social structures.
 S. Leder/B. Streck (ed.): Shifts and Drifts in Nomad-Sedentary Relations. Nomaden und Sesshafte 2 (Wiesbaden 2005)
 Lithwick, Harvey. "An Urban Development Strategy for the Negev's Bedouin Community". Center for Bedouin Studies and Development and Negev Center for Regional Development, Ben-Gurion University of the Negev, August 2000
 Mohsen, Safia K. The quest for order among Awlad Ali of the Western Desert of Egypt.
 Thesiger, Wilfred (1959). Arabian Sands.  (Penguin paperback). British adventurer lives as and with the Bedu of the Empty Quarter for 5 years

External links

Arab groups
Ethnic groups in Jordan
Ethnic groups in Egypt
Ethnic groups in Israel
Ethnic groups in Libya
Ethnic groups in Tunisia
Ethnic groups in Algeria
Ethnic groups in Morocco
Ethnic groups in Western Sahara
Ethnic groups in Mauritania
Ethnic groups in Sudan
Ethnic groups in Saudi Arabia
Bedouin
Ethnic groups in the United Arab Emirates
Ethnic groups in Yemen
Ethnic groups in Qatar
Ethnic groups in Oman
Ethnic groups in Bahrain
Ethnic groups in Kuwait
Ethnic groups in Iraq
Ethnic groups in Syria
Ethnic groups in Lebanon
Nomadic groups in Eurasia
Modern nomads
Pastoralists

Ethnic groups in North Africa
Ancient peoples of the Near East
Ethnic groups in the Middle East
Tribes of Arabia
Arab tribes in Morocco
Arab tribes in Algeria
Arab tribes in Mauritania
Arab tribes in Western Sahara